Andrés Eduardo Jiménez Caicedo (born 27 August 1986) is a Colombian racing cyclist who represents Colombia in BMX. He represented Colombia at the 2008 and 2012 Summer Olympics in the men's BMX event.  At the 2008 Games, he reached the final but finished just outside the medals. In 2012 he again reached the final, but only finished in 6th place on this occasion.

References

External links
 
 
 

1986 births
Living people
BMX riders
Colombian male cyclists
Olympic cyclists of Colombia
Cyclists at the 2008 Summer Olympics
Cyclists at the 2012 Summer Olympics
Pan American Games medalists in cycling
Pan American Games bronze medalists for Colombia
Cyclists at the 2011 Pan American Games
Medalists at the 2011 Pan American Games
South American Games medalists in cycling
South American Games bronze medalists for Colombia
Competitors at the 2010 South American Games
Sportspeople from Bogotá
21st-century Colombian people